Milyutinsky (masculine), Milyutinskaya (feminine), or Milyutinskoye (neuter) may refer to:
Milyutinsky District, a district of Rostov Oblast, Russia
Milyutinsky (rural locality), a rural locality (a khutor) in Krasnodar Krai, Russia
Milyutinskaya, a rural locality (a stanitsa) in Rostov Oblast, Russia